Robert Roy Korfhage (December 2, 1930 – November 20, 1998) was an American computer scientist, famous for his contributions to information retrieval and several textbooks.

He was son of Dr. Roy Korfhage who was a chemist at Nestlé in Fulton, Oswego County, New York.  Korfhage earned his bachelor's degree (1952) in engineering mathematics at University of Michigan, while working part-time at United Aircraft and Transport Corporation in East Hartford as programmer.  At the same university, he earned a master's degree and Ph.D. (1962) in mathematics,
his PhD dissertation being On Systems of Distinct Representatives for Several Collections of Sets
advised by Bernard Galler (1962).

Korfhage taught mathematics at North Carolina State University (1962–64), Purdue University (1964–70), Southern Methodist University (1970–86) and the University of Pittsburgh School of Information Sciences (1986–98).

Korfhage's research focused on graph theory and information retrieval. For instance, his Information Storage and Retrieval (1997) was winner of American Society for Information Science and Technology Best information science book award (1998).

In his later years, he worked on new ways of information visualization and also genetic algorithms to optimize text queries.

He died of cancer in Pittsburgh.

Books
 1966: Logic and Algorithms, Wiley
 1970: (with Harley Flanders) Calculus, Academic Press
 1974: (with Harley Flanders and Justin Jesse Price) A Second Course in Calculus, Academic Press
 1984: Discrete Computational Structures, Academic Press
 1987: (with Norman E. Gibbs) Principles of Data Structures and Algorithms with Pascal, William C. Brown Publications
 1997: Information Storage and Retrieval, Wiley.

References

American computer scientists
University of Michigan alumni
Purdue University faculty
Southern Methodist University faculty
University of Pittsburgh faculty
People from Fulton, Oswego County, New York
1930 births
1998 deaths
Scientists from New York (state)